The Metropolitan Transportation Authority (MTA) operates a number of bus routes in Queens, New York, United States, under two different public brands.  Some of them are the direct descendants of streetcar lines (see list of streetcar lines in Queens).

List of routes
This table gives details for the routes prefixed with "Q"—in other words, those considered to run primarily in Queens by the MTA. For details on routes with other prefixes, see the following articles:
 List of bus routes in Brooklyn: B13, B15, B20, B24, B26, B32, B38, B52, B54, B57, B62
 List of bus routes in Manhattan: M60 Select Bus Service
 List of bus routes in Nassau County, New York: n1, n4, n4X, n6, n6X, n20G, n22, n22X, n24, n26, n31, n32, n33
 List of express bus routes in New York City: BM5, QM1, QM2, QM3, QM4, QM5, QM6, QM7, QM8, QM10, QM11, QM12, QM15, QM16, QM17, QM18, QM20, QM21, QM24, QM25, QM31, QM32, QM34, QM35, QM36, QM40, QM42, QM44, X63, X64, X68

Each route is marked with the operator. Routes marked with an asterisk (*) run 24 hours a day. The full route is shown except for branching. Connections to New York City Subway stations at the bus routes' terminals are also listed where applicable.

Q1 to Q24

Q25 to Q49

Q50 to Q77

Q83 to Q114

Dollar vans

When the MTA discontinued some routes on June 27, 2010, operators of commuter vans, also known as dollar vans, were allowed to take over certain discontinued routes. In Queens, these routes were the Q74 and Q79. There are also dollar vans that operate from Jamaica Center, providing an alternative mode of transportation to bus routes such as the Q4 to Cambria Heights, the Q113 to Far Rockaway, and the Q5 and Q85 to Green Acres Mall. The vans, some licensed by the New York City Taxi and Limousine Commission and some unlicensed, charge a fare of $2.00, lower than the $2.75 fare for MTA-operated local buses, but without free transfers.

In December 2011, City Councilman Leroy Comrie pushed the city to create designated bus stops for the dollar van services to alleviate traffic and interference of dollar vans with MTA buses. These dollar van stops for drop off and pick ups now includes the corner of 153rd Street and Archer Avenue along with Parsons Boulevard between Archer and Jamaica Avenue.

History of current routes

Routes Q1 to Q46

Routes Q47 to Q114

Proposed bus route changes

In December 2019, the MTA released a draft redesign of the Queens bus network with 77 routes. The routes were given a "QT" label to avoid confusion with existing routes. The "QT" prefix was tentative; in the final plan, all bus routes would have been labeled with "Q", similar to the existing routes. The final redesign was initially expected in mid- or late 2020, but the first draft attracted overwhelmingly negative feedback, with 11,000 comments about the plans. The redesign was delayed due to the COVID-19 pandemic in New York City. Planning resumed in mid-2021.

The original draft plan was dropped, and a revised plan with 85 routes was released on March 29, 2022. A final plan will be released in early 2023. The new plan retains the "Q" prefix and preserves most of the existing routes. However, the new plan still contains significant changes compared with the existing bus map; only the Q70 SBS was not modified at all. In addition, 11 routes will be eliminated, 20 routes will be created, and 29 others will be truncated, extended, or combined with other routes. Several Brooklyn routes are being changed; for these changes, see .

There are to be four types of routes:
 Crosstown/Select Bus Service (originally high-density) - routes connecting highly populated corridors, with limited stops every 
 Rush (originally subway connector) - routes connecting one or two neighborhoods to subway hubs, with a limited-stop section between the subway and the relevant neighborhoods. These often correspond to current routes with limited-stop variants.
 Limited-stop (originally intra-borough) - routes connecting several neighborhoods to subway hubs. These do not necessarily correspond to the current definition of limited-stop services, as the stops are spaced only slightly further than on local routes.
 Local (originally neighborhood) - routes connecting several neighborhoods to subway hubs and important destinations, typically at lower frequencies and higher stop densities compared to limited-stop routes

Routes marked with an asterisk (*) are proposed to run 24 hours a day. For rush routes, streets with nonstop sections are notated in italics.

Q1 to Q24

Q25 to Q49

Q50 to Q78

Q80 to Q115

Former routes
Below are the list of former Queens bus routes, including the previous route designations of current routes. Several route numbers for NYCTA buses in Queens and other boroughs were changed on July 1, 1974. On December 11, 1988, when the Archer Avenue lines opened to Jamaica Center–Parsons/Archer station, some of the Brooklyn "B" routes that operate primarily in Queens were redesignated as "Q" routes, and a number of other routes were renumbered or modified. Most of the former routes are operated by NYCTA; some were operated by private companies in Queens.

References

External links
Media related to Buses in Queens, New York City at Wikimedia Commons
MTA NYC Transit - Bus Service
"Queens Bus Map". Metropolitan Transportation Authority.
"Queens Bus Service". Metropolitan Transportation Authority.
Northeast Queens Bus Study – MTA (September 28, 2015)

Transportation in Queens, New York
Bus routes in Queens
Queens
 
Lists of New York City bus routes
Queens, New York-related lists